YuruYuri is a Japanese anime series based on the comedy manga series by Namori, which is published in Comic Yuri Hime. The series follows the everyday lives of Akari, Kyoko, Yui and Chinatsu who make up the Amusement Club at their school. The first series aired AT-X between July 5 and September 20, 2011 and was simulcast on Crunchyroll. A second season, titled YuruYuri♪♪, aired in Japan between July 2, 2012 and September 17, 2012 and was also simulcast by Crunchyroll. An original video animation by TYO Animations, YuruYuri Nachuyachumi!, was released on Blu-ray Disc and DVD on February 18, 2015. It was followed by two specials, titled YuruYuri Nachuyachumi!+, which aired in August and September 2015. A third season titled YuruYuri San Hai!, also by TYO Animations, aired between October 5, 2015 and December 21, 2015. A new OVA, titled YuruYuri, (pronounced "YuruYuri Ten"), was announced on April 22, 2018 to celebrate the manga's tenth anniversary. The OVA is animated by Lay-duce instead of TYO Animations, with Daigo Yamagishi as director, Takahiro as scriptwriter, and Kazutoshi Inoue serving as character designer and chief animation designer. The new OVA was crowdfunded and completed its goal in February 2019. It was released on November 13, 2019 and had its television premiere on AT-X on February 23, 2020.

The anime has been licensed in North America by NIS America.

A four-episode original net animation series produced by DMM.Futureworks and W-Toon Studio, titled MiniYuri, began streaming on Pony Canyon's YouTube channel from September 25, 2019.  The series is directed by Seiya Miyajima, with Takahiro as scriptwriter, and Yasuhiro Misawa composing the music.


Episode list

YuruYuri (2011)

YuruYuri♪♪ (2012)

YuruYuri Nachuyachumi! (2015 OVA + TV specials)

YuruYuri San☆Hai! (2015)

MiniYuri (2019 ONA)

YuruYuri, (2019 OVA)

References

YuruYuri